Taleh Tut (also Romanized as Taleh Tūt and Talah Tūt; also known as Qal’eh Tūt-e Soflá, Taleh Tū, and Taleh Tūh) is a village in Dasht-e Hor Rural District, in the Central District of Salas-e Babajani County, Kermanshah Province, Iran. At the 2006 census, its population was 41, in 7 families.

References 

Populated places in Salas-e Babajani County